Chŏngjin is the capital of North Korea's North Hamgyong Province (함경북도) and the country's third largest city. It is sometimes called The City of Iron.

History

Prehistory
According to archaeological findings near the lower areas of the Tumen river, evidence of human living traces back to the paleolithic period.

Ancient and medieval history
According to the Records of the Grand Historian, the region was where the tribe kingdoms of Buyeo, Mohe, Okjeo, Yilou, Yemaek and Sushen existed. The region later was the territory of Goguryeo. After the fall of Goguryeo in 668, the region was ruled by the Tang dynasty. During the reign of Balhae, the region was under the subdivision donggyeongyongwonbu. The region was under the rule of the Jin dynasty and Yuan dynasty after the fall of Balhae by the Khitans.

Modern history

Chongjin was a small fishing village prior to the Japanese annexation of Korea; its date of establishment is unknown. The Chinese characters for its name mean 'clear river crossing'. During the Russo-Japanese War of 1904–1905, Japanese forces landed at Chongjin and established a supply base due to its proximity to the front lines in Manchuria. The Japanese remained after the end of the war, and in 1908, declared the city an open trading port both for the transport of Korean resources and as a stopping point for resources from China. The city was known during this period as “Seishin”, after the Japanese pronunciation of the Chinese characters for its name. The Imperial Japanese Army’s 19th Division was headquartered in Ranam from 1918, where the Japanese built a new planned city based on a rectangular street grid. In 1930, Nippon Steel built a large steel mill, the Seishin Iron and Steel Works, in the town. Ranam was annexed to Chongjin in 1940, which was elevated to city status. The city was overrun after a brief resistance by the Soviet Union on 13 August 1945, only two days before the end of World War II. Under the rule of North Korea, Chongjin remained an important military and industrial centre. It was directly administered by the central government from 1960–1967 and from 1977–1988.

During the North Korean famine of the 1990s, Chongjin was one of the worst affected locations in the country; death rates may have been as high as 20%. Conditions there remain poor in terms of food availability. This problem has caused several instances of civil unrest in Chongjin, a rarity in North Korea. On 4 March 2008, a crowd of women merchants protested in response to tightened market controls. Rising grain prices and government attempts to prohibit "peddling in the market" have been cited as causes for the protests. As a result of the protest, the Chongjin local government "posted a proclamation allowing peddling in the market." On 24 August 2008, a clash occurred between foot patrol agents and female merchants, which escalated into a "massive protest rally". It was reported that the Chongjin local government-issued verbal instructions relaxing the enforcement activity until the time of the next grain ration.

Administrative divisions 
From 1948 to 1960, 1967 to 1977, and 1987 to present, Ch'ŏngjin was governed as a part of North Hamgyong Province. From 1960 until 1967, and again from 1977 to 1987, Chongjin was administered as a directly governed city.

Ch'ŏngjin is divided into 7 wards (구역, kuyŏk).
 Ch'ŏngam-guyŏk (청암구역)
 P'ohang-guyŏk (포항구역)
 Puyun-guyŏk (부윤구역)
 Ranam-guyŏk (라남구역)
 Sinam-guyŏk (신암구역)
 Songp'yŏng-guyŏk (송평구역)
 Sunam-guyŏk (수남구역)

Geography 
Chongjin is located in the northeast of North Korea, in North Hamgyong Province, near the East Korea Bay (Kyŏngsŏng Bay) in the Sea of Japan. The Susong River (수성천) runs through the city; contained in the city are the Sodu Stream (서두수) and Mount Komal (고말산).

Climate 
Chongjin has a humid continental climate (Köppen climate classification: Dwb) with cold, dry winters and warm, rainy summers.

Economy 
Chongjin is one of the DPRK's important steel and fiber industry centers. It has a shipyard, a locomotive plant, and a rubber factory. Near the port area are the Chongjin Steel Co., Chemical Textile Co., May 10 Coal Mine Machinery Factory, and Kimchaek Iron & Steel (which was called Nippon Steel during the Japanese occupation); however industrial activities in the city have been severely handicapped due to a lack of resources. Despite this, however, Chongjin is estimated to have a 24 percent share of the DPRK's foreign trade and is home to a resident Chinese consul who serves Chinese merchants and businesspersons operating in the northeast of the country. Chongjin also contains Sunam Market, an example of market economics in North Korea.

Because of the heavy concentration of industries in the area, Chongjin is also the DPRK's air pollution black spot. With the collapse of the Soviet Union and the subsequent shortage of oil to generate electricity, many factories have been shuttered. One of the first senior U.N. officials permitted to visit the area, Tun Myat, observed in 1997 when the North Korea economic crisis reached its peak, "Chongjin was like a forest of scrap metal, with huge plants that seem to go on for miles and miles that have been turned into rust buckets. I've been all over the world, and I've never seen anything quite like this."

Chongjin Bus Factory, established in 1981, supplies a large number of buses and trolleybuses to Chongjin. It also builds the trams used within Chongjin, including one articulated tram. In recent years, the factory has built more trolleybuses that visually resemble the Chollima-321 of the Trolleybuses in Pyongyang.

The city is powered by the Chongjin Thermal Power Plant. The coal used by the power plant is allegedly mined in Kwan-li-so No.22, although since then the prison has apparently been closed. The plant has an estimated generation capacity of 150 MW.

Other industries
 Chosun Clothing Factory – makes Vinalon cloth into uniforms
 North Hamgyong Provincial Broadcasting Company
 Majon Deer Company – makes medicine from deer antlers
 Second Metal Construction Company
 Onpho Hot Springs
 Soenggiryong mines – kaolin mine
 North Hamgyong Provincial E-Business Institute

The area has little arable land, so the famine in the 1990s hit the residents of Chongjin particularly hard. During the late 1990s, the city's residents experienced some of the highest death rates from famine, which might have been as high as 20 percent of the population. By 1995, the local frog population was wiped out due to overhunting.

Prisons
 In Chongjin political prison camp (Kwan-li-so No. 25), a large prison complex in Susong-dong (northern part of Chongjin), more than 3,000 political prisoners are allegedly forced to manufacture bicycles and other consumer goods.
 Chongori reeducation camp (Kyo-hwa-so No. 12) is located halfway between Chongjin and Hoeryong.
 The Nongpo Detention Center, which was built during the Japanese occupation, is still in use but under new management.

Shipping
Chongjin's port has established itself as a critical component of busy international shipping trade with neighbouring parts of Northeast and Southeast Asia. Of DPRK's eight international shipping ports, Chongjin is thought to be the second most economically important (after Nampho port on the west coast) and serves as a base of trade to Russia and Japan. Chongjin also boasts a seamen's club which serves to cater for foreign crews as well as a meeting base for North Koreans and foreigners engaged in the shipping trade.

The People's Republic of China and Russia have set up their consulates in Chongjin. It is unique for a North Korean city to have a foreign consulate. Chongjin is the administrative centre of the North Hamgyong Province.

Transport

Air
Orang Airport located in Orang County 40 kilometres from Chongjin is equipped with a  runway on military and civilian dual purpose air station (CHO). North Korea planned to upgrade an old airport near Hamhung as late as 2003, so that it would have a  runway, and would act as the nation's second international airport. However, it is still not completed.

Rail
The Wonson-Rason Railway and Chongjin-Rason Railway (Pyongra Line) electric railways operated by the Korean State Railway connect Rason and capital Pyongyang.

Urban transit
Chongjin is the only city in North Korea other than Pyongyang to operate a tram system. These trains are all locally manufactured. It consists of one line built in two phases, phase 1,, and phase 2,. It has a turning loop in Pongchon and Namchongjin, with the depot located in Sabong.

A trolleybus system also operates with 3 lines: Chongam - Yokchon, Hae'an - Sabong and Namchongijn - Ranam.

Education

Universities and colleges 
There are several state-run higher educational facilities located here, such as:

 Chongjin University of Technology
 Chongjin Mine University
 Chongjin University of Education No. 1 (Oh Jungheup University)
 University of Education No. 2
 Hambuk University It used to be called Hambuk Agricultural University formerly until 1993.
 Chongjin University of Medicine
 Chongjin College of Light Industry
 Chongjin College of Metal Engineering
 Chongjin College of Automation Engineering

The Kim Jong-suk Teachers' College, which was named after Kim Jong-il's mother, Kim Jong-suk, is in Chongjin.

Schools 
Schools for gifted and talented students include:

 Chongjin No.1 Senior Middle School: One of science high schools for gifted students in North Korea.
 Chongjin School of Foreign Languages
 Chongjin School of Arts

Culture 
There is an aquatic product research center. Famous scenic sites include hot springs and Mt. Chilbo. Chongjin's most famous product is processed squid. 
The city is home to the football team, the Ch'ŏngjin Chandongcha.

The local newspaper is the Hambuk Daily.

Chongjin is featured in the book Nothing to Envy: Ordinary Lives in North Korea by Barbara Demick.

Other cultural locations
 North Hamgyong Province Theater (함경북도 극장)
 Chonmasan Hotel for foreign visitors to stay at, built to convey the power of the government over the individual; in 1997, a French aid worker from Action contre la Faim was allowed to stay there but was not let out of the hotel to observe the famine conditions.
 Pohanng Square has a 25-foot bronze statue and the Revolutionary History Museum
 Inmin Daehakseup Dang (Grand People's Study House)
 Chongjin Children's Palace (청진학생소년궁전): Artistic talented students do extracurricular activities here after school.

Sister cities 
Chongjin has two sister cities:
 Changchun, China
 Jilin, China

Notable people from Chongjin
 An Song-il, North Korean Soccer player
 Jang Song-thaek, North Korean politician and uncle of Kim Jong-un, current leader of North Korea
 Kim Swoo-geun, South Korean architect
 Kim Yik-yung, South Korean ceramic artist
 Pak Chang-sik, North Korean politician
 Ri Sol-ju, the First Lady of North Korea and the wife of North Korean Supreme Leader Kim Jong-un.
 Ri Ul-sol, North Korean Marshal and politician
 Shin Sang-ok, South Korean film producer and director
 Kang Nara (born 1997), North Korean defector living in Seoul, South Korea

Historic gallery

See also

 List of cities in North Korea
 Geography of North Korea

References

Further reading

Dormels, Rainer. North Korea's Cities: Industrial facilities, internal structures and typification. Jimoondang, 2014.

External links
 
 
 
 City profile of Chongjin

 
Cities in North Hamgyong
Port cities and towns in North Korea